The maternal mortality ratio is a key performance indicator (KPI) for efforts to improve the health and safety of mothers before, during, and after childbirth per country worldwide. Often referred to as MMR, it is the annual number of female deaths per 100,000 live births from any cause related to or aggravated by pregnancy or its management (excluding accidental or incidental causes). It is not to be confused with the maternal mortality rate, which is the number of maternal deaths (direct and indirect) in a given period per 100,000 women of reproductive age during the same time period. The statistics are gathered by WHO, UNICEF, UNFPA, World Bank Group, and the United Nations Population Division. The yearly report started in 1990 and is called Trends in Maternal Mortality. As of the 2015 data published in 2016, the countries that have seen an increase in the maternal mortality ratio since 1990 are the Bahamas, Georgia, Guyana, Jamaica, Dem. People’s Rep. Korea, Serbia, South Africa, St. Lucia, Suriname, Tonga, United States, Venezuela, RB Zimbabwe. But  according to Sustainable Development Goals report 2018, the overall maternal mortality ratio has declined by 37 percent since 2002. Nearly 303,000 women died due to complications during pregnancy.

With an exceptionally high mortality ratio compared to other U.S. states, the government of Texas created the  Maternal Mortality and Morbidity Task Force in 2013.

Country measurements

This KPI was used for the Millennium Development Goals from 2000 to 2015 and is part of the Sustainable Development Goals. The list of countries with a comparison of this KPI in 1990, 2000 and 2015 are:

List of aggregated data by region

List of aggregated data by focus subject

See also
 List of countries by infant and under-five mortality rates
 List of countries by maternal mortality ratio
 List of countries by death rate
 Maternal mortality

References

Death-related lists
Maternal death
Demography
World Health Organization